M. H. Douglas (born Muhammad Hussain Khan) was an Indian actor, director, action director, and fight composer in the Hindi film industry. He choreographed fight and action scenes for many Bollywood hits. He is also one of the founding member of the Fight and Cine artist Association based in Mumbai.

As an actor, Douglas appeared in many silent films in the 1940s and 1950s.

Early life and background 

Douglas was born on 2 October 1910 to prominent Muslim parents in Hyderabad State, India. His grandfather, Nawab Kale Khan was a Nawab in the Princely State Hyderabad. 
After an inheritance dispute, Douglas's father came to Bombay before the Independence of India and integration of Princely State Of Hyderabad into the Indian Union. Douglas grew up as Muhammad Hussain and used stage name "M. H. Douglas" after entering the Hindi film industry. From a very young age, Douglas had a keen interest and was trained in Aerobics, Fencing, Swordsmanship, and Martial Arts.

Career
Douglas started his career as a background actor in many silent movies. He appeared as a lead actor in several silent films most of which are now Lost films. Several attempts have been made to search those films in the Film archives.

Death
On the afternoon of 30 March 1964, Douglas suffered a heart attack and died before reaching the hospital.

Selected filmography

References

 
 M.H. Douglas - Biography
 

Indian action choreographers
1910 births
1964 deaths
Film directors from Hyderabad, India
20th-century Indian film directors
Male actors from Hyderabad, India
Indian male silent film actors
20th-century Indian male actors
Male actors in Hindi cinema
Indian male film actors
Indian stunt performers